The Little Machias River is a  river in Maine. Via the Aroostook River, it is part of the Saint John River watershed.

See also
List of rivers of Maine

References

Maine Streamflow Data from the USGS
Maine Watershed Data From Environmental Protection Agency

External links 

Rivers of Maine
Geography of Aroostook County, Maine